Modła  (German: Modlau) is a village in the administrative district of Gmina Gromadka, within Bolesławiec County, Lower Silesian Voivodeship, in south-western Poland.

It was the site of the castle Modlau which was almost completely destroyed.  Castle Modlau was one of the seats of the Bibran-Modlau family.

References

External links 
 Facebook Page on village with photos with emphasis on destroyed castle

Villages in Bolesławiec County